Agia Triada, Ayia Triada or Hagia Triada is Greek for Holy Trinity (Αγία Τριάδα), and  common toponym. It may refer to:

 Hagia Triada, an archaeological site of the Minoan civilization in Crete, Greece
 Agia Triada, Boeotia, a village in Boeotia, Greece
 Agia Triada, Corfu, a village in Corfu, Greece
 Agia Triada, Elis, a village in Elis, Greece
 Agia Triada, Evrytania, a village in Evrytania, Greece, Greece
 Agia Triada, Kastoria, a municipal unit in Kastoria regional unit, Greece
 Agia Triada, Lasithi, a village in Lasithi, Greece
 Agia Triada, Magnesia, a village in Magnesia, Greece
 Agia Triada, Phthiotis, a village in Phthiotis, Greece
 Agia Triada, Thessaloniki, a village in the Thessaloniki regional unit, Greece
 Agia Triada, Trikala, a village in the Trikala regional unit, Greece
 Agia Trias, Cyprus

Churches and Monasteries 

 Hagia Triada Cathedral, Piraeus
 Agia Triada Monastery, Crete, Greece
 Hagia Triada Church, Ayvalık
 Hagia Triada Greek Orthodox Church, Istanbul
 Monastery of the Holy Trinity, Meteora